In statistics, when performing multiple comparisons, a false positive ratio (also known as fall-out or false alarm ratio) is the probability of falsely rejecting the null hypothesis for a particular test. The false positive rate is calculated as the ratio between the number of negative events wrongly categorized as positive (false positives) and the total number of actual negative events (regardless of classification).

The false positive rate (or "false alarm rate") usually refers to the expectancy of the false positive ratio.

Definition 
The false positive rate is 

The level of significance that is used to test each hypothesis is set based on the form of inference (simultaneous inference vs. selective inference) and its supporting criteria (for example FWER or FDR), that were pre-determined by the researcher.

When performing multiple comparisons in a statistical framework such as above, the false positive ratio (also known as the false alarm ratio, as opposed to false positive rate / false alarm rate ) usually refers to the probability of falsely rejecting the null hypothesis for a particular test. Using the terminology suggested here, it is simply .

It is worth noticing that the two definitions ("false positive ratio" / "false positive rate") are somewhat interchangeable. For example, in the referenced article  serves as the false positive "rate" rather than as its "ratio".

Classification of multiple hypothesis tests

Comparison with other error rates 

While the false positive rate is mathematically equal to the type I error rate, it is viewed as a separate term for the following reasons:
 The type I error rate is often associated with the a-priori setting of the significance level by the researcher: the significance level represents an acceptable error rate considering that all null hypotheses are true (the "global null" hypothesis). The choice of a significance level may thus be somewhat arbitrary (i.e. setting 10% (0.1), 5% (0.05), 1% (0.01) etc.)

 As opposed to that, the false positive rate is associated with a post-prior result, which is the expected number of false positives divided by the total number of hypotheses under the real combination of true and non-true null hypotheses (disregarding the "global null" hypothesis). Since the false positive rate is a parameter that is not controlled by the researcher, it cannot be identified with the significance level.
 Moreover, false positive rate is usually used regarding a medical test or diagnostic device (i.e. "the false positive rate of a certain diagnostic device is 1%"), while type I error is a term associated with statistical tests, where the meaning of the word "positive" is not as clear (i.e. "the type I error of a test is 1%").

As the number of tests grows, the familywise error rate usually converges to 1 while the false positive rate remains fixed.

See also 
 False positives and false negatives
 False coverage rate
 False discovery rate
 Sensitivity and specificity

References 

Multiple comparisons
Statistical tests
Analysis of variance
Statistical ratios